Electric chair is a chair that a condemned prisoner is strapped in and electrocuted.

Electric chair may also refer to:
Organizations for the disabled sometimes use "electric chair" to mean an electric-powered wheelchair, or an armchair with electric-powered ability to tip forward and sometimes also to rotate.
Electric chair, a wrestling hold
Electric chair lift, meaning an electric-powered stairlift
Big Electric Chair, a 1967 series of paintings by pop artist Andy Warhol

Music
Electric Chair (album), a compilation album by Australian rock group Hoodoo Gurus
"Electric Chair", a song by Steelheart from Wait
"Electric Chair", a 1989 song by Prince from the album Batman
Wayne County & the Electric Chairs, a punk band, founded around 1976